Martin Kompalla (born 26 January 1992) is a German-born Polish former professional footballer who played as a goalkeeper.

Career
On 10 February 2020, Kompalla signed for RoPS, making 8 appearances in all competitions before leaving the club by mutual consent on 12 August of the same year.

Career statistics

Club

Notes

References

External links
 

1992 births
Living people
Polish footballers
German footballers
Polish expatriate footballers
Poland youth international footballers
Association football goalkeepers
Borussia Mönchengladbach II players
VfL Bochum players
SV 19 Straelen players
Vaasan Palloseura players
Regionalliga players
Expatriate footballers in Finland
Sportspeople from Mönchengladbach
Footballers from North Rhine-Westphalia